Psalm 88 is the 88th psalm from the Book of Psalms. According to the title, it is a "psalm of the sons of Korah" as well as a "maskil of Heman the Ezrahite". In the slightly different numbering system in the Greek Septuagint version of the Bible, and in its Latin translation, the Vulgate, this psalm is Psalm 87.

Portrayal
It is described Psalm for the sons of Korah, a prayer for mercy and deliverance, and a Maschil.

According to Martin Marty, a professor of church history at the University of Chicago, Psalm 88 is "a wintry landscape of unrelieved bleakness". Psalm 88 ends by saying:

Indeed, in Hebrew, the last word of the psalm is "darkness".

Uses

Judaism
Psalm 88 is recited on Hoshana Rabbah.

Eastern Orthodox Church and Catholic Church
 This psalm is part of the Six Psalms (Psalms 3, 38, 63, 88, 103 and 143) that constitute the heart of the orthros, that is to say Matins, in the Orthodox and Catholic churches of the Byzantine Rite.
 In the Liturgy of the Hours revised after Vatican II, the psalm is said on Fridays as part of compline.

Commentary

It is often assumed that the Psalm is a sick Psalm. The disease which laid low the psalmist could have been leprosy or some other unclean illness. Others see rather than a specific disease, a more general calamity.

By contrast, Hermann Gunkel contends that this psalm involves accusations against the Psalmist, regarding his sins mentioned.

Neale and Littledale find it "stands alone in all the Psalter for the unrelieved gloom, the hopeless sorrow of its tone. Even the very saddest of the others, and the Lamentations themselves, admit some variations of key, some strains of hopefulness; here only all is darkness to the close."

Musical settings

 Marc-Antoine Charpentier compose around 1690 one "Domine Deus salutis meae" , H.207 for soloists, chorus, flutes, strings, and continuo.

References

External links 

 in Hebrew and English - Mechon-mamre
 King James Bible - Wikisource

088